Agonopterix scopariella is a moth of the family Depressariidae. It is found in most of Europe, except Ireland, most of the Balkan Peninsula, Ukraine, Finland and the Baltic region.

The wingspan is 18–23 mm. Adults are variable, but usually have two black and two white spots on the wing. The white spots are often ringed by black scales. They are on wing from August to April.

The larvae feed on broom (Cytisus scoparius). They feed in spun shoots of their host plant. Larvae can be found from June to late July. The species overwinters as an adult.

Subspecies
Agonopterix scopariella scopariella
Agonopterix scopariella calycotomella Amsel, 1958 (Cyprus)

References

External links
lepiforum.de

Agonopterix
Moths described in 1870
Moths of Europe
Taxa named by Hermann von Heinemann